Yuliya Bakastova (born 26 June 1996) is a Ukrainian sabre fencer. She is the 2018 European silver medalist in team event.

Life and career
She started competing for Ukraine in season 2016/17. Since then she represents Ukraine at various international competitions. At the 2018 European Fencing Championships in Novi Sad, Serbia, she won her first international medal.

References

External links
 Profile

1996 births
Living people
Ukrainian female sabre fencers
Sportspeople from Kyiv
20th-century Ukrainian women
21st-century Ukrainian women